The 2004 IIHF World Championship Final was an ice hockey match that took place on May 9, 2004 in Prague, Czech Republic, to determine the winner of the 2004 IIHF World Championship. Canada defeated Sweden to win its 23rd championship.

Details

See also 
 2004 IIHF World Championship
 Canada men's national ice hockey team
 Sweden men's national ice hockey team

References 
Official IIHF game report
Game report on hockeyarchives.info

Sweden men's national ice hockey team games
2003
W
w
IIHF World Championship Finals
Final
Sports competitions in Prague
IIHF World Championship Final